H Thompson (born Sydney, Australia) was a rugby league footballer in the New South Wales Rugby League (NSWRL)'s foundation season - 1908. Thompson played for the Eastern Suburbs club.

References
 

Australian rugby league players
Sydney Roosters players
Year of death missing
Year of birth missing
Rugby league players from Sydney